Charles Hallgarten, or Charles/Karl Lazarus Hallgarten (18 November 1838, Mainz – 19 April 1908, Frankfurt/Main) was a German banker and philanthropist.

His father was Lazarus Hallgarten, founder of Hallgarten & Company, and his mother was Eleonore Hallgarten (born Darmstädter, in Mannheim).

External links 
 Descendants of Charles Hallgarten 
 Hallgarten hiess die Hoffnung at www.dieneueepoche.com 
 Charles Hallgarten: Eine Art Beichtvater der Zeitsorgen - Kultur - Rhein-Main-Zeitung - FAZ.NET at www.faz.net

German bankers
Jewish bankers
German philanthropists
19th-century German Jews
1838 births
1908 deaths
Burials at the Old Jewish Cemetery, Frankfurt
19th-century philanthropists
People from Mainz